Flekkefjord Church is a parish church of the Church of Norway in the large Flekkefjord Municipality in Agder county, Norway. It is located in the town of Flekkefjord. It is the church for the Flekkefjord parish which is part of the Lister og Mandal prosti (deanery) in the Diocese of Agder og Telemark. The white, wooden church was built in the Empire style and in an octagonal design in 1833 using plans drawn up by the architect Hans Linstow. The church seats about 650 people.

It has galleries with audience seating on two floors along five of the walls. The altarpiece is a gold cross in an arch, flanked by columns carrying a gable. The pulpit is from 1938 and signed by Linstow. The organ has 24 voices.

History
The earliest existing historical records of the church date back to the year 1460, but there is evidence that suggest that the church was likely built during the 12th century. The medieval stave church stood until around the year 1783 when it was torn down. A new timber-framed, octagonal building was completed on the same site about three years later. In 1831, the church was again torn down and replaced with a larger building on the same site. The new church was also had an octagonal design. The new church was consecrated in January 1833.

Media gallery

See also
List of churches in Agder og Telemark

References

Flekkefjord
Churches in Agder
Wooden churches in Norway
Octagonal churches in Norway
19th-century Church of Norway church buildings
Churches completed in 1833
12th-century establishments in Norway